Afroarctia is a genus of tiger moths in the family Erebidae. The genus was erected by Hervé de Toulgoët in 1978. The moths occur in the Afrotropics.

Species
 Afroarctia bergeri Toulgoët, 1978
 Afroarctia dargei (Toulgoët, 1976)
 Afroarctia histrionica Toulgoët, 1978
 Afroarctia kenyana (Rothschild, 1933)
 Afroarctia mamfei Toulgoët, 1978
 Afroarctia nebulosa Toulgoët, 1980
 Afroarctia sjostedti (Aurivillius, 1899 [1900])

References

Spilosomina
Moth genera